Kimlan Foods Co., Ltd. is a Taiwanese food products company headquartered in Daxi District, Taoyuan City, Taiwan. As of 2008 it is the largest soy sauce manufacturer in Taiwan. The Chinese-language Reader's Digest ranked Kimlan as a winner of the gold awards in 2008.

History
The company was originally founded as Datung Company on 8 May 1936 by Mr. Han Chung. In 1970, the company was renamed as Kimlan Soy Sauce. In 1987, it was renamed again to Kimlan Foods Co., Ltd.

References

1936 establishments in Taiwan
Food and drink companies established in 1936
Food and drink companies of Taiwan
Companies based in Taoyuan City